The Norway national rugby sevens team is a minor national sevens side. It competes annually in the Rugby Europe sevens competition. For the 2022 season, the team played in the Rugby Europe Sevens Conference 1.

References

Rugby union in Norway
National rugby sevens teams